Martín Cortés de Albacar (1510–1582) was a Spanish cosmographer. In 1551 he published the standard navigational textbook Arte de navegar (also known as Breve compendio)

Cortés was born in Bujaraloz, province of Zaragoza, Aragon. From 1530, in Cádiz, he taught cosmography and the art of navigation to pilots.

Art of Navigation
Cortés' book, Breve compendio,...Arte de navegar was promoted by Steven Borough who had it translated into English by Richard Eden and published in 1561 entitled The Art of Navigation. As such it became the first English manual of navigation and the primary text for European navigation throughout the early 17thC, enjoyed by such as Martin Frobisher and Francis Drake.

Arte de navegar was a practical book in which Cortés discussed, in a concise manner, navigation, cosmography and problems such as magnetic declination for which he hypothesised a Celestial magnetic pole.

He included many illustrations and models for making instruments. and the text contained the earliest known description of the Nocturnal and how to make and use a sea astrolabe

Cortés' calculations were critical in allowing explorers to ascertain their location when out of sight of land.

In 1574, the mathematician William Bourne, produced a popular version of the book, entitled A Regiment for the Sea. Bourne was critical of some aspects of Arte de Navegar and produced a manual of more practical use to the seaman.

He died aged 72.

References

1510 births
1582 deaths
16th-century Spanish astronomers
Spanish navigators